David Blankenhorn (born 1955 in Jackson, Mississippi) is the founder and president of the Institute for American Values and its initiative Braver Angels. He is also co-director of The Marriage Opportunity Council and the author of Fatherless America and The Future of Marriage. A noted figure in the campaign against same-sex marriage in the United States, his position changed and he voiced support of legalizing same-sex marriage in June 2012.

Biography
Blankenhorn received a bachelor's degree in Social Studies, magna cum laude, from Harvard University in 1977; he was also awarded a master's degree, with distinction, in Comparative Social History from University of Warwick in Coventry.  Blankenhorn served as a VISTA volunteer and was involved in community organizing.  Blankenhorn founded the Institute for American Values, a nonpartisan think tank whose stated mission is to "study and strengthen key American values", in 1987.  In 1992, President George H. W. Bush appointed Blankenhorn to serve on the National Commission on America's Urban Families. Blankenhorn helped to found the National Fatherhood Initiative, a nonpartisan organization focused on responsible fatherhood, in 1994.  As of 2007, Blankenhorn has written "scores of op-ed pieces and essays, co-edited eight books and written two." Blankenhorn identifies as a liberal Democrat.

Blankenhorn and his wife Raina are the parents of three children, and they reside in New York City.

Braver Angels 
Braver Angels (originally Better Angels) is an initiative from Institute for American Values working to depolarize US politics. Founded shortly after the 2016 presidential election, the organization runs workshops, debates, and other events where red (conservative) and blue (liberal) participants come to better understand each other's positions and discover their shared values. The name Better Angels was inspired by Lincoln's plea for national unity at the close of his first inaugural address. The name was changed to Braver Angels in 2020 pursuant to a trademark infringement suit.

Perry v. Schwarzenegger testimony
Blankenhorn was presented to the court as an expert witness in Perry v. Schwarzenegger by the proponents of California Proposition 8 (2008), a constitutional amendment restricting marriage to the union of opposite-sex couples. On cross-examination by David Boies, Blankenhorn stated that marriage's "rule of two people" is not violated by polygamy, because "Even in instances of a man engaging in polygamous marriage, each marriage is separate.  He — one man — marries one woman."  During questioning, Blankenhorn stated "I believe that adopting same-sex marriage would be likely to improve the well-being of gay and lesbian households and their children." Also, he identified 22 other benefits of adopting same-sex marriage, published on page 203 of his book The Future of Marriage, stating only 5 with which he disagreed. Some of the benefits with which he did agree included that it would: increase the proportion of gays and lesbians in stable, committed relationships; lead to higher living standards for same-sex couples; lead to fewer children growing up in state institutions and more growing up in loving adoptive and foster families; decrease the amount of anti-gay prejudice and hate crimes; and decrease the number of those warily viewed as "other" in society, further reaching the American ideal.  In the decision filed on August 4, 2010, Judge Vaughn Walker ruled that Blankenhorn was not qualified as an expert witness, and that his testimony was "unreliable and entitled to essentially no weight."

Changing position on same-sex marriage
In June 2012, Blankenhorn announced in a New York Times opinion column that his stance on same-sex marriage had changed. He noted that the opposition voiced in his book and in his trial testimony was founded in a belief "that children have the right, insofar as society makes it possible, to know and to be cared for by the two parents who brought them into this world", a right that he points out is guaranteed by the 1990 United Nations Convention on the Rights of the Child. But while that belief had not changed (being central to his view that “gay marriage has become a significant contributor to marriage’s continuing deinstitutionalization”), it was now trumped by other more holistic factors. He cites "the equal dignity of homosexual love", "comity", and "respect for an emerging consensus" as positive reasons for his now supporting same-sex marriage. Noting that the fight against same-sex marriage had not advanced the cause of marriage more generally, he expressed a hope that gay and straight couples alike could join together in efforts to strengthen marriage.

Cultural depictions
Blankenhorn appears as a character in 8, Dustin Lance Black's play about the trial surrounding Proposition 8, in which the character recites portions of the Perry v. Schwarzenegger testimony. The part has been performed by Rob Reiner and John C. Reilly. Rob Reiner played Blankenhorn again in When We Rise.

References

External links
Institute for American Values profile
New York Times op-ed piece co-authored by Blankenhorn
Perry Trial Transcripts (Blankenhorn begins Day 11 and Day 12)

1955 births
Harvard College alumni
Living people
Activists from New York City
Alumni of the University of Warwick